Eishockey Club Bregenzerwald, commonly referred to as EHC Bregenzerwald or simply Bregenzerwald, is an ice hockey team in Bregenzerwald, Austria. The club was founded in 1985.

Honours
Inter-National League:
Winners (2): 2012–13, 2015–16
Runners-up (1): 2013–14

External links
Official website 

Ice hockey clubs established in 1985
Ice hockey teams in Austria
Inter-National League teams
Austrian National League teams
1985 establishments in Austria